Nadav Davidovitch (born July 5, 1969, Haifa, Israel) is a public health physician, epidemiologist and the chair of Israel's association of Public Health Physicians. He replaced Hagai Levine, in 2021, as interim director.   Davidovitch has also served as chair of the Center for Health Policy Research in the Negev.  Considered an infectious disease expert, he is also a member of Israel's “corona czar’s” advisory committee.

He serves on several other committees including the European Public Health Association’s Governing Board.

At Ben-Gurion University of the Negev’s School of Public Health, Davidovitch is a professor, chair of the Department of health systems management and the first Director.At the University of Connecticut! He is an advisory Board me,Ber for ARCHES|AmeRicans’ Conceptions of Health Equity Study.

In the 2005–2006 school year, he was a Fulbright Visiting Professor at the Columbia University Mailman School of Public Health Department of Sociomedical Sciences and at the University of Illinois Chicago School of Public Health (2008 and 2016).

Education
Davidovitch earned a B.A., Magna cum laude, in 1995 froTel Aviv University (TAU) in 1995.  He received a M.D. degree the same year with a thesis entitled Thyroid Function in Preterm: The Influence of Iodine Containing Disinfectants. Also at TAU, he earned a Ph.D. In the history of science with a thesis Framing Scientific Medicine: The Relationship between Homeopathy and Conventional Medicine in the US, 1870-1930 (Advisors: Prof. Allan Brandt - Harvard University, Prof. Eva Jablonka, Dr. Moshe Zuckerman).  In 2005, he recited an M.P.H -from Ben-Gurion University in Epidemiology (Health System Management Track) with a thesis entitled Health status and Patterns of Use of Health Services among Recent Immigrants from the Former Soviet Union and Ethiopia (Advisors Lechaim Naggan, Shifra Shvarts).

Selected publications
Israelis, Demand Palestinians Get Vaccinated, Too. Or the Pandemic Won’t End
Eli Jaffe, Keren Dopelt, Nadav Davidovitch, Yuval Bitan, “Vaccination of the Elderly in Assisted Living by the Israeli Emergency Medical Services”, American Journal of Public Health 111, no. 7 (July 1, 2021): pp. 1223-1226.
Trauma and Memory: Reading, Healing, and Making Law
Into the “New Normal”: The Ethical and Analytical Challenge Facing Public Health Post-COVID-19
Governance, Quarantine and Isolation in light of Public Health Ethics during the COVID-19 Pandemic

References

Israeli public health doctors
Israeli epidemiologists
Living people
1969 births
Physicians from Haifa
Tel Aviv University alumni
Ben-Gurion University of the Negev alumni
Academic staff of Ben-Gurion University of the Negev
Israeli science writers